The following highways are numbered 557:

United States

Other places